Kanjrur is a union council of tehsil Shakargar,District Narowal, Punjab, Pakistan. It is situated on the bank of Basenter (برساتی نالا).

The council is named after a significant Sufi called Kanju peer, whose tomb is in the village, as is the tomb of Baba Mithay shah.

Villages near Kanjrur include Bhilowali, Nangal, Isaharwali, Kapurdeo, Fatehpur, Chhina,Viram, Nawan pind, Mian wali and Jattar and Mallah.

Crops grown in the area include wheat, sugarcane and rice.
 

Populated places in Narowal District

.